The All Saints Episcopal Church is an historic Carpenter Gothic church located at 155 Clark Street in Enterprise, Florida, United States. On May 3, 1974, it was added to the U.S. National Register of Historic Places.

References

External links
 Volusia County listings at National Register of Historic Places
 Florida's Office of Cultural and Historical Programs
 Volusia County listings
 All Saints Episcopal Church Florida Heritage
 All Saints Episcopal Church

Episcopal church buildings in Florida
National Register of Historic Places in Volusia County, Florida
Churches on the National Register of Historic Places in Florida
Carpenter Gothic church buildings in Florida
Churches in Volusia County, Florida
Enterprise, Florida
1883 establishments in Florida
Churches completed in 1883